Deer Lick Nature Sanctuary is a protected forest and gorge in Cattaraugus County, New York. The preserve is within  Zoar Valley near Gowanda, and is managed by The Nature Conservancy.

History 
Deer Lick Nature Sanctuary was created by a donation from Miss Evelyn Alverson to The Nature Conservancy in 1960 with a further donation of Deer Lick Falls by Herbert F. Darling. It was designated a National Natural Landmark in November 1967 for its mature hardwood forest and its gorges which highlight the Onondaga Escarpment.

As of 2005, the preserve covered ,  of which contain old-growth forest. The south fork of the Cattaraugus Creek runs alongside part of the preserve. In 2006 the preserve expanded via grants and purchases.

See also
List of National Natural Landmarks in New York

References

External links
The Nature Conservancy: Deer Lick Conservation Area

National Natural Landmarks in New York (state)
Nature Conservancy preserves in New York (state)
Nature reserves in New York (state)
Protected areas of Cattaraugus County, New York